SAP Business Explorer is a tool of the software company SAP SE to create planning applications, and for planning and data entry in BW Integrated Planning.

Architecture 
The architecture of SAP Business Explorer can be separated into 3 areas:

 Ad-hoc Query and Analyse
 This mainly consists Web Analyzer.
 Reporting and Analyse Design
 Main components are Web Application Designer and Report Designer.
 Microsoft Excel Integration
 This consists Analyser (Add-in).

See also 

 SAP NetWeaver Application Server

References

External links 

 Official Documentation

SAP SE